Yangshu Township  is a township-level division situated in the Acheng district of Harbin, Heilongjiang province, China. It is situated 5 km southwest of Acheng city and has a population of 32000.

See also
List of township-level divisions of Heilongjiang

References

Township-level divisions of Heilongjiang